Salvador, meaning "salvation" (or "saviour") in Catalan, Spanish, and Portuguese may refer to:

 Salvador (name)

Arts, entertainment, and media

Music
Salvador (band), a Christian band that plays both English and Spanish music
Salvador (Salvador album), 2000
Salvador (Ricardo Villalobos album), 2006
Salvador (Sega Bodega album) 2020
"Salvador", a song by Jamie T from the 2007 album Panic Prevention

Other uses in arts, entertainment, and media
Salvador (book), a 1983 book by Joan Didion
Salvador (character), a fictional character from the Borderlands video game series
Salvador (film), a 1986 motion picture about the Salvadoran civil war of the 1980s
Salvador (Puig Antich), a 2006 Spanish film about Salvador Puig Antich
"Salvador" (short story), a 1984 science fiction short story by Lucius Shepard

Places

El Salvador
 El Salvador, a Central American country
 San Salvador, the capital of El Salvador

Philippines
 El Salvador, Misamis Oriental, a city in the province of Misamis Oriental
 Salvador, Lanao del Norte, a municipality in the province of Lanao del Norte
 Salvador Benedicto, Negros Occidental, a municipality in the province of Negros Occidental

United States
 Lake Salvador, a lake in the State of Louisiana, United States of America

Elsewhere 
 Salvador, Bahia, the capital of the State of Bahia, Brazil, the largest city in the world with this name
 Salvador (Madrid), a ward of San Blas-Canillejas district, Madrid, Spain
 Salvador Settlement, a community in the Falkland Islands, United Kingdom
 Tevego, previously known as Villa del Divino Salvador, a settlement in the Concepción Department, Paraguay

Other uses
Salvador (grape), a red wine grape grown primarily in California
Salvador (Sav), a protein kinase involved in the Hippo signaling pathway

See also
 El Salvador (disambiguation)
 San Salvador (disambiguation)
 Salvator (disambiguation)
 Salvatore (disambiguation), an Italian word also meaning "saviour"
 Savior (disambiguation)